Jan Costin Wagner (born 13 October 1972 in Langen) is a German crime fiction writer. His novels are set in Finland and feature detective Kimmo Joentaa.

Biography 
Wagner studied German Literature and History at university in Frankfurt, and later worked as a journalist. His first novel, "Nachtfahrt" (Night Trip) was published to much acclaim in 2002 and won the Marlowe Prize for Best Crime Novel. His wife is a native of Finland, and they spend time both there and in Germany. His 2007 novel The Silence was adapted into the 2010 German film of the same name in English; the original name of the film in German is Das letzte Schweigen, i.e. The last Silence.

Bibliography 
 Eismond 2003, (Ice Moon, translated to English 2005)
 Das Schweigen 2007 (Silence, translated to English 2010)
 Im Winter der Löwen 2009 (The Winter of the Lions, translated to English 2011)
 Light in a Dark House (2013)

External links 
 Authors official homepage  (in German)

German crime fiction writers
Living people
German male novelists
1972 births